Ponazuril (INN), sold by Merial, Inc., now part of Boehringer Ingelheim, under the trade name Marquis® (15% w/w ponazuril), is a drug currently approved for the treatment of equine protozoal myeloencephalitis (EPM) in horses, caused by coccidia Sarcocystis neurona. More recently, veterinarians have been preparing a formulary version of the medication for use in small animals such as cats, dogs, and rabbits against coccidia as an intestinal parasite. Coccidia treatment in small animals is far shorter than treatment for EPM.

See also 
 Clazuril
 Diclazuril
 Toltrazuril

References 

Equine medications
Diphenyl ethers
Benzosulfones
Trifluoromethyl compounds
Isocyanuric acids